Is Anybody Listening may refer to:

 Is Anybody Listening? (book), a 1952 book by William H. Whyte
 Is Anybody Listening?, a 1987 film directed by Saeed Akhtar Mirza
 "Is Anybody Listening?", an episode of Theodore Tugboat

In music:
 "Is Anybody Listening", a song by Brotha Lynch Hung and Doomsday Productions from The Plague
 "Is Anybody Listening", a song by Danity Kane from Welcome to the Dollhouse
 "Is Anybody Listening", a song by Forgiven Rival from This Is a War
 "Is Anybody Listening?", a song from The Ten Commandments: The Musical

See also 
 "Anybody Listening?", a song by Queensrÿche
 "Anybody Listening?", a song by Classified from Self Explanatory
 "Anybody Listening", a song by Suffrajett from Black Glitter
 "Is Anybody Listening To Me?", EP from Erin Bowman